Salmon Bay is a bay about  wide at the entrance between Cape Cesney and Lewis Island in Antarctica. It was discovered from the Aurora by the Australasian Antarctic Expedition (1910–14) under Douglas Mawson, and named Davis Bay by Mawson for Captain John King Davis, master of the Aurora and second-in-command of the expedition.

In June 2017, the official name as recognised by the New Zealand Geographic Board was altered to Salmon Bay.

The 11 km-long Salmon Stream flows from Salmon Glacier into Salmon Bay.

References

Bays of Wilkes Land